Wesley Pacheco Gomes (born 24 April 1990), known as Wesley, is a Brazilian footballer who plays as a forward for Esportivo.

Club career
Wesley was born in Sertãozinho, São Paulo, and graduated with Grêmio. He made his senior debuts for the club in 2011, appearing in that year's Campeonato Gaúcho.

On 3 February 2012 Wesley was loaned to Novo Hamburgo. In December he returned to Grêmio, but moved to Pelotas also in a temporary deal.

After another loan stint at Red Bull Brasil, Wesley left Grêmio in April 2014, after his contract expired. He subsequently returned to Novo Hamburgo, and in November signed for Cruzeiro-RS.

On 14 April 2015 Wesley signed with Goiás. He made his Série A debut on 10 May, starting in a 0–0 away draw against Vasco.

References

External links

1990 births
Living people
Footballers from São Paulo (state)
Brazilian footballers
Association football forwards
Campeonato Brasileiro Série A players
Campeonato Brasileiro Série B players
Campeonato Brasileiro Série D players
Grêmio Foot-Ball Porto Alegrense players
Esporte Clube Novo Hamburgo players
Esporte Clube Pelotas players
Esporte Clube Cruzeiro players
Goiás Esporte Clube players
Clube Esportivo Aimoré players
FC Cascavel players
Boa Esporte Clube players
Veranópolis Esporte Clube Recreativo e Cultural players
Sociedade Esportiva e Recreativa Caxias do Sul players
América Futebol Clube (MG) players
Paysandu Sport Club players
People from Sertãozinho